Raymond Neal Clemence,  (5 August 1948 – 15 November 2020) was an England international football goalkeeper and part of the Liverpool team of the 1970s. He is one of only 31 players to have made over 1,000 career appearances, and holds the record for the most clean sheets in the history of football (460). Winning three European Cups, five League titles, two UEFA Cups, a UEFA Super Cup, an FA Cup and a League Cup with Liverpool, the last of his 665 appearances for the club was the victorious 1981 European Cup Final. In 1981, after being phased out at Liverpool, Clemence joined Tottenham Hotspur, winning a UEFA Cup, an FA Cup, and a Charity Shield with them, before retiring from football in 1988.

After brief spells as joint-manager at Tottenham (alongside Doug Livermore) and sole manager at Barnet in the first half of the 90s, he acted as head of the FA Development Team, overseeing the development made by players in the England youth teams from under-16 to 21 level, having previously been part of the England senior team's backroom staff.

Club career

Scunthorpe United 
Born in Skegness, Lincolnshire, Clemence played eight matches on trial for Notts County, but was ultimately not signed by the Meadow Lane club. He was spotted by Scunthorpe United whilst playing in a county-cup final at their Old Showground ground for his local youth club Skegness Cosmos. After starring in the Cosmos' 4-3 victory, Clemence was invited for formal trials with "The Iron", which he duly passed. Clemence went on to sign professional terms for Scunthorpe on his 17th birthday, 5 August 1965, shortly before the start of Scunthorpe's 1965–66 Third Division campaign.

Despite initially playing in the club's 'third team', Clemence's big break arrived later in his debut season - making his professional debut in a 1-1 draw at home to Swansea Town on 2 April 1966. Prior to this debut, Clemence remembers a key behind-the-scenes intervention from two Scunthorpe coaches: "Jack Brownsword and Alan Bushby pulled me aside, gave me a pep talk and told me they thought I could play for England one day but 'you've got to work at it'".

Clemence went on to make four appearances in total throughout his debut season, including earning his first professional clean sheet in a 1-0 victory away at Southend United. Having spent much of that season as understudy to the experienced former Wolverhampton Wanderers and Aston Villa custodian Geoff Sidebottom, Clemence later cited Sidebottom as a crucial early mentor: "I learned a lot from Geoff. He taught me how to look after myself because 'keepers were a lot less protected then."

During his time at the club, Clemence lived with Mrs Ruby Duce of King Edward Street in Scunthorpe; in the very same digs which would then immediately be occupied by Ray's future England and Liverpool teammate Kevin Keegan following Clemence's departure to Liverpool.

After being reintroduced to the side after they had lost their opening three games in all competitions, Clemence became Scunthorpe's undisputed first-choice goalkeeper in their following 1966–67 Third Division campaign, in which they finished a disappointing 18th. After manager and ex-Busby Babe Freddie Goodwin departed mid-season for the New York Generals in the nascent North American Soccer League, Clemence spent the latter half of his season under the guidance of caretaker player-manager Keith Burkinshaw, who would later also sign the player for Tottenham Hotspur.

And despite Clemence himself worrying that a humiliating 7-1 defeat away to arch-rivals Grimsby Town could end his professional career, Scunthorpe's faith in him never waivered and this defeat proved to be the second game in a run of 46 consecutive starts he made to see out all of Scunthorpe's remaining league and cup matches.

This run took Clemence's figures to 50 appearances and 12 clean sheets in all competitions for Scunthorpe; but unbeknownst to him, he had been scouted in 12 games by legendary Liverpool manager Bill Shankly and his coaching staff. This came to fruition later that summer, when Clemence was forced to leave a beachside deckchair-stacking shift early, with the news that an urgent telegram awaited him at home. This was because Liverpool's bid for the now 18-year-old shot-stopper had been accepted, and the Scunthorpe chairman personally drove Clemence to Anfield in his Rolls-Royce the next morning.

Looking back on his time with the club, Clemence fondly recalled how Scunthorpe United was: "A club I'm proud to be associated with. While I was there it was like being part of a family.

Liverpool 
Clemence was signed by Liverpool manager Bill Shankly on 24 June 1967 from Scunthorpe United for a fee of £18,000. He made his debut and kept his first clean sheet in a League Cup third round tie at Anfield on 25 September 1968, Swansea Town were the visitors and were beaten 2–0. He was nurtured through the reserve side over the next two years, with the occasional senior appearance, until 1970, at which point he became the club's first choice goalkeeper.

In 1971 Liverpool reached the FA Cup Final, where Clemence played well but Arsenal scored twice in extra time to overcome Liverpool's lead and win the game 2–1. There would be joy for Clemence two seasons later in 1973 when Liverpool won both the League title and UEFA Cup, with Clemence saving a penalty in the final of the latter against Borussia Mönchengladbach. The penalty save meant that Liverpool took a 3–0 lead to Germany with them, rather than 3–1. Gladbach won 2–0 at home, had Jupp Heynckes scored the penalty, then with the same second-leg result the tie would have finished 3–3 on aggregate, and Borussia Mönchengladbach would have won on the away goals rule. The 1973–74 season saw Liverpool claim yet more silverware winning the FA Cup with a comprehensive 3–0 victory over Newcastle United.

Liverpool won another League and UEFA Cup double in 1976 and then made a bid for a unique treble a year later. They achieved the first leg when they won the League title, but lost the FA Cup final 2-1 to rivals Manchester United. A few days later, Liverpool won the European Cup for the first time in Rome, defeating Borussia Mönchengladbach 3–1. In the second half Clemence made a magnificent save against Uli Stielike when the score was 1–1.

Liverpool retained the European Cup in 1978 with a narrow 1–0 win over Club Brugge at Wembley, but conceded their League title to Nottingham Forest, to whom they also lost in the League Cup final. In 1979 and 1980, Clemence kept goal as Liverpool clinched the League title in each season. The 1978–79 League success saw Clemence set a record that was never beaten under the two points for a win system, conceding only 16 goals in the 42 league matches (and just 4 at Anfield). This remarkable record remains for a 42-match season and endured until beaten in the 2004–05 season by Chelsea, who conceded 15 goals in the 38 League matches.

In 1981 Liverpool won the League Cup, and for the third time the European Cup, the latter with a 1–0 win over Real Madrid in a dour contest at the Parc des Princes on 27 May. It turned out to be Clemence's last game for the club.

The emergence of Bruce Grobbelaar put Clemence's place in the side under threat for the first time in eleven years (during which period he played in more than 650 matches and missed a mere six), and he decided to leave Liverpool to join Tottenham Hotspur for a fee of £300,000.

Tottenham Hotspur 
Clemence left Liverpool to join Tottenham Hotspur in 1981 for a fee of £300,000. The two clubs reached the 1982 League Cup final, which Liverpool won 3–1. Spurs did, however, win the 1982 FA Cup, defeating QPR 1–0 after a replay.

Clemence's first Tottenham appearance was in the 1981 FA Charity Shield against Aston Villa at Wembley on 22 August 1981, where Mark Falco and Peter Withe each scored twice in an entertaining 2–2 draw. His League debut came a week later with a winning start at Ayresome Park, where Spurs beat Middlesbrough 3–1. His first clean-sheet came three games later on 12 September at Molineux, when he kept Wolverhampton Wanderers off the scoresheet in the 1–0 victory.

Spurs won the UEFA Cup in 1984. Clemence missed the final against Anderlecht through injury, but was on the bench as substitute goalkeeper in a match famously won when Tony Parks saved twice during the penalty shootout. Clemence reached a fifth FA Cup final in 1987, where Spurs lost to Coventry City. He is in a select group of players who have appeared in five or more FA Cup finals. Clemence sustained an Achilles tendon injury in Tottenham's away match at Norwich in October 1987, which forced his retirement from playing in 1988. Shortly after retiring Clemence joined the Spurs coaching staff.

International career 
Clemence was a regular for England between 1972 and 1983 making his debut and keeping his first clean-sheet in the 1–0 World Cup qualifier win over Wales at Ninian Park on 15 November 1972. England failed to qualify for World Cups in 1974 and 1978. Clemence was part of the squad which qualified for Euro 1980 but the team failed to qualify from Group 2. In 1982, he was in the squad which qualified for the World Cup, but again England did not progress beyond the quarter-final stage.

Clemence captained England, once, the first keeper to do so since Frank Swift. The game in question was a friendly with Brazil, although Clemence couldn't prevent the Brazilians from scoring as England lost 1–0.

Because of injury to his left knee Clemence was retired from international football with 61 England caps in a 12-year international career. The presence of another goalkeeper, Peter Shilton, meant that the England management struggled to decide which keeper was the best, and ended up alternating their selection. Shilton ended up as first choice keeper for the rest of the 1980s, playing in two more World Cups and attaining a record 125 caps.

Coaching career

Management 
Clemence retired in 1988 and joined the coaching staff at Spurs, working his way through to the first team, before leaving to become joint manager of Barnet (with fellow goalkeeper Gary Phillips) in January 1994. At the start of the 1994–95 season, he took sole charge leading Barnet to ninth and 13th in Division 3.

England coaching team 
In August 1996 he was recruited by his former Spurs and England teammate Glenn Hoddle as goalkeeping coach for the England team, a position he continued to hold under Hoddle's successors Kevin Keegan and Sven-Göran Eriksson. He remained in that position under Steve McClaren until he was replaced by Italian Franco Tancredi as goalkeeping coach in December 2007, as Fabio Capello took charge of the national team. Clemence, however, remained part of the England backroom staff, and when Roy Hodgson took over as manager, he reinstated Clemence to the Goalkeeper coach role. On 11 June 2012, he snapped his Achilles tendon during England's warmups for their game against France during Euro 2012.

He was the head of the F.A.'s Head of Development Team, where his role was to oversee the England under 16s, 17s, 18s, 19s and 20 sides, working with England U21 coach Stuart Pearce in monitoring the players' progress to the U21 side. He also occasionally worked as a pundit on TV and radio, and commented on current goalkeeping stories in football.

In 2013, Clemence retired; being "lavishly saluted", and being bought a gift from the England national team; despite his last appearance at an international level being 30 years earlier.

Personal life and death 
Clemence was appointed an MBE in the 1987 Birthday Honours for services to football. His son, Stephen, was a midfield player who came through the ranks at Spurs and Birmingham City, before retiring injured from Leicester City in 2010. He was the Newcastle United first team coach under Steve Bruce. Clemence's daughter Sarah also has footballing connections, being the wife of former Crystal Palace and Nottingham Forest manager and Scotland striker Dougie Freedman.

In February 2005, Clemence announced that he had been diagnosed with prostate cancer and that he would spend time away from the England squad whilst he received treatment. He was the second member of Eriksson's staff to be diagnosed with prostate cancer; Brian Kidd was diagnosed with the disease prior to Euro 2004.

Clemence is held in high regard by both Liverpool and Tottenham fans. He was voted in at No. 11 on the Liverpool Football Club web site poll 100 Players Who Shook The Kop; he was also the highest placed goalkeeper. He was also chosen as goalkeeper in the BBC's Merseyside team of the 20th century, and topped Total Footballs poll of the best ever goalkeeper, beating players of the calibre of Peter Shilton, Lev Yashin, Gordon Banks and Pat Jennings.

Clemence died on 15 November 2020, after 15 years with prostate cancer. He was 72.

Honours 
Liverpool
Football League First Division: 1972–73, 1975–76, 1976–77, 1978–79, 1979–80
FA Cup: 1973–74
League Cup: 1980–81
FA Charity Shield: 1974, 1976, 1977 (shared), 1979, 1980
European Cup: 1976–77, 1977–78, 1980–81
UEFA Cup: 1972–73, 1975–76
European Super Cup: 1977

Tottenham Hotspur
FA Cup: 1981–82
FA Charity Shield: 1981 (shared)
UEFA Cup: 1983–84

See also 
 List of men's footballers with the most official appearances

References

External links 

Official past players at Liverpoolfc.tv
England coaches at thefa.com
Profile at Liverweb.org.uk
Ray Clemence at goalkeepersaredifferent.com

List of great players at truegreats.com
Player profile at LFChistory.net
Ray Clemence @ Goalkeeping Greats

1948 births
2020 deaths
People from Skegness
Barnet F.C. managers
England international footballers
England under-23 international footballers
English football managers
English footballers
UEFA Euro 1980 players
1982 FIFA World Cup players
Premier League managers
Association football goalkeepers
Liverpool F.C. players
Members of the Order of the British Empire
Scunthorpe United F.C. players
Tottenham Hotspur F.C. players
Tottenham Hotspur F.C. managers
English Football League players
English Football Hall of Fame inductees
English Football League representative players
UEFA Champions League winning players
UEFA Cup winning players
FA Cup Final players
Deaths from prostate cancer
Deaths from cancer in England